Grenadine  is a commonly used nonalcoholic bar syrup characterized by its deep red color. It is a popular cocktail ingredient renowned for its flavor as well as its ability to give a reddish or pink tint to mixed drinks. Grenadine is traditionally made from pomegranate.

Etymology and origin
The name "grenadine" originates from the French word grenade, which means pomegranate, from Latin grānātum "seeded".
Grenadine was originally prepared from pomegranate juice, sugar, and water. It is not related to the Grenadines archipelago, which takes its name from Grenada, which is itself named for Granada, Spain.

Modern and commercial variants
As grenadine is subject to minimal regulation, its basic flavor profile can alternatively be obtained from a mixture of blackcurrant juice and other fruit juices, with the blackcurrant flavor dominating.

To reduce production costs, manufacturers have widely replaced fruit bases with artificial ingredients. The Mott's brand "Rose's" is by far the most common brand of grenadine sold in the United States, and is formulated from (in order of concentration): high fructose corn syrup, water, citric acid, sodium citrate, sodium benzoate, FD&C Red #40, natural and artificial flavors, and FD&C Blue #1.

Use in cocktails

Grenadine is commonly used to mix both modern and classic cocktails, including:

 El Presidente – rum, orange curaçao, vermouth, and grenadine
 Mary Pickford – white rum, pineapple juice and grenadine
 Queen Mary – beer, grenadine and maraschino cherries, drizzled with cherry syrup
 Singapore Sling – a gin-based sling cocktail
 Tequila Sunrise – tequila, orange juice and grenadine
 Ward 8 – "a whiskey sour with a few dashes of grenadine added"
 Zombie – a rum-based Tiki cocktail

In Belgium, grenadine is sometimes added to certain beers, like Trappist or gueuze.

Grenadine is also a popular ingredient in some non-alcoholic drinks, such as the Roy Rogers, pink lemonade, and Shirley Temple cocktails, or simply mixed with cold water or soda in a glass or jug, sometimes with ice.

See also
 List of syrups

References

External links 
 

Drink mixers
Syrup